Raffles, the Amateur Cracksman may refer to:

Raffles, the Amateur Cracksman (1917 film), starring John Barrymore
Raffles, the Amateur Cracksman (1925 film), starring House Peters